Exient Entertainment (also known as Exient Company) is an independent video game developer and publisher based in the United Kingdom and Malta. Mainly developing for handheld gaming systems, Exient grew a name for itself shrinking popular series' games to portable systems. It is known for its ports of various games in the Madden NFL, FIFA, Need for Speed, and Tiger Woods PGA Tour series for Electronic Arts and for developing numerous titles in the Angry Birds series. The company was incorporated in 2000 and began operations in January 2001.

Until 2013, the bulk of their development was for dedicated portable gaming platforms such as PSP, Nintendo DS, and Game Boy Advance but since 2014 their games have been developed for Android and iOS only. Exient currently develops its games on a proprietary, in-house developed, engine named XGS and the Unity platform.

Games developed

2023
Ultimate Sackboy (iOS, Android) - developed and published by Exient Publishing Limited

2019
Lemmings (iOS, Android) - developed and published by Exient Publishing Limited

2017
Top Gear: Donut Dash (iOS, Android) - published by BBC Worldwide

2016
Dancing with the Stars (iOS, Android) - published by Donut Publishing
Strictly come Dancing (iOS, Android) - published by Donut Publishing
F1 2016 (iOS, Android) - published by Codemasters

2014
Angry Birds Transformers (iOS and Android) - published by Rovio
Bake Escape (iOS) - published by Donut Publishing

2013
Angry Birds Go!" (Android/iOS/Blackberry 10)Diggs Nightcrawler (PS3)Angry Birds Trilogy (Vita)Angry Birds Star Wars(PS3/PS4/PS Vita/X360/Xbox One/Wii/Wii U/3DS)CSR Racing (Android)

2012Angry Birds Trilogy (3DS/Vita)Fireworks (Vita)Pulzar (Vita)

2010Need for Speed: Hot Pursuit (Wii)The Sims 3 (NDS)FIFA 11 (NDS)X2 Football 2010 (iOS) - published by X2 GamesX2 Snowboarding (iOS) - published by X2 Games

2009FIFA 10 (NDS)DJ Hero (Wii/PS2)Tiger Woods PGA Tour (iOS)X2 Football 2009 (iOS)

2008FIFA 09 (NDS)Madden NFL 09 (NDS)Tiger Woods PGA Tour 09 (PS2/PSP)Skate It (NDS)Need for Speed: Undercover (Wii/PS2)FIFA Street 3 (NDS) 

2007NASCAR 08 (PS2)FIFA 08 (NDS)Madden NFL 08 (NDS)Tiger Woods PGA Tour 08 (NDS)Need for Speed: ProStreet (NDS)

2006FIFA Street 2 (NDS)2006 FIFA World Cup (GBA/NDS/PSP)Madden NFL 07 (GBA/NDS)FIFA 07 (GBA/NDS)NASCAR 07 (PSP) Need for Speed: Carbon (NDS)

2005FIFA Football 2005 (Gizmondo)SSX 3 (Gizmondo)Madden NFL 06 (GBA/NDS)FIFA 06 (GBA/NDS)

2004Madden NFL 2005 (GBA/NDS)FIFA Soccer 2005 (GBA/N-Gage)SSX Out Of Bounds (N-Gage)WWE Aftershock (N-Gage)

2003Total Soccer (Mobile)FIFA Soccer 2004 (GBA/N-Gage)NCAA Football 2004 (N-Gage)

2002Alex Ferguson's Player Manager 2002 (GBA) - published by UbisoftFIFA Soccer 2002 (PDA)NHL Hitz 20-03 (GBA)FIFA Football (GBA)

2001Steven Gerrard's Total Soccer 2002'' (GBA) - published by Ubisoft

Awards 
 TIGA Best Casual Game 2013 Diggs Nightcrawler
 BAFTA Best Handheld Game (Nominated), The Sims 3 (NDS)
 Gamescom 2010 Best Mobile Title (Nominated), The Sims 3 (NDS)
 IGN 2007 Best Sports Game
 IGN 2007 Best Developer
 Pocket PC Magazine Best Software Award 2003 Total Soccer
 IGN Best Handheld Sports Game 2003 FIFA 04 GBA
 IGN Best Handheld Sports Game 2005 FIFA Soccer 06 NDS
 TIGA Best Handheld Games Development Studio 2005
 Develop 100 - The World’s Most Successful Game Studios - 2007 Edition - (position 50)
 Develop 100 - The World’s Most Successful Game Studios - 2009 Edition - (position 67)

References

 GameSpot – All Games by Exient Entertainment
 GameSpot, August 15, 2005 – Review of WWE Aftershock

External links 
 
 Exient Entertainment entry at MobyGames
 Companies House – Exient Limited – Company No. 04028014

Companies based in Oxford
British companies established in 2000
Video game companies established in 2000
Video game companies of the United Kingdom
Video game development companies
2000 establishments in England